Sir Arthur John Coles  (born 13 November 1937) is a retired British diplomat. He served as the Permanent Under-Secretary of State for Foreign Affairs (Head of HM Diplomatic Service) from 1994 to 1997.

Coles joined the FCO in 1960. After learning Arabic he was posted as Third Secretary in Sudan from 1962 until 1964. He served as the Assistant Political Agent, Trucial States (Dubai) from 1968–1971 as the UAE was being established. He returned to London until being sent as Head of Chancery to the British Embassy in Egypt from 1975–77. He served as Ambassador to Jordan, High Commissioner to Australia before he returned to London as Deputy Under-Secretary of State from 1991–94. In 1994 he was appointed Permanent Under-Secretary of State.

Offices held

References

External links
Interview with Sir Arthur John Coles & transcript, British Diplomatic Oral History Programme, Churchill College, Cambridge, 2000

Living people
1937 births
People educated at Magdalen College School, Brackley
Alumni of Magdalen College, Oxford
Members of HM Diplomatic Service
Knights Grand Cross of the Order of St Michael and St George
High Commissioners of the United Kingdom to Australia
Ambassadors of the United Kingdom to Jordan
Permanent Under-Secretaries of State for Foreign Affairs
20th-century British diplomats